Yerragondapalem Assembly constituency is a scheduled caste reserved constituency in Prakasam district of Andhra Pradesh. It is one of the seven assembly segments of Ongole Lok Sabha constituency, along with Darsi, Ongole, Kondapi, Markapuram, Giddalur and Kanigiri.  As of 25 March 2019, there are a total of 200,379 electors in the constituency. In 2019 state assembly election
Audimulapu Suresh was elected as an MLA of the constituency, representing the YSR Congress Party.

It was newly formed as part of the Delimitation of Parliamentary and Assembly Constituencies Order, 2008 and active from the 2009 Andhra Pradesh Legislative Assembly election. after dissolving the Cumbum Assembly Constituency.

Mandals

Members of Legislative Assembly Yerragondapalem  (2009-till)

Election results

Assembly elections 2019

Assembly elections 2014

Assembly Elections 2009

Assembly elections 1972

Assembly elections 1967

Assembly elections 1962

Assembly elections 1955

See also
 List of constituencies of Andhra Pradesh Legislative Assembly

References

Assembly constituencies of Andhra Pradesh